Vellalath Kochukrishnan Nair Sreekandan is an Indian politician from Kerala and a member of the Indian National Congress. V. K. Sreekandan is also the president of the Palakkad district Congress Committee. Sreekandan is also a Member of Parliament of the 17th Lok Sabha of India from Palakkad Lok Sabha constituency.

References

India MPs 2019–present
Lok Sabha members from Kerala
Living people
Indian National Congress politicians from Kerala
People from Palakkad
1971 births